The 2001 GP Ouest-France was the 65th edition of the GP Ouest-France cycle race and was held on 2 September 2001. The race started and finished in Plouay. The race was won by Nico Mattan of the Cofidis team.

General classification

References

2001
2001 in road cycling
2001 in French sport
September 2001 sports events in France